SS Peter Silvester, was an American merchant marine ship built for the United States Maritime Commission. She was operated by the Pacific Far East Line under charter with the Maritime Commission and War Shipping Administration.

History
The SS Peter Silvester was laid down on March 31, 1942 and built by the California Shipbuilding Corp. The ship was named after Peter Silvester (1734–1808), an American politician who was a member of the United States House of Representatives from New York, who backed the patriot cause during the American Revolution.  The ship launched nearly two months later, on May 27, 1942.

Sinking

1st attempt
On April 29, 1943, the ship, unescorted, was unsuccessfully attacked by  while en route from Espírito Santo to San Francisco, California. Two torpedoes passed beneath the ship and exploded harmlessly some distance away.

2nd attempt
Both torpedoes struck on the starboard side at the #3 hold. It was reported that one torpedo went straight through the ship while the other detonated in the hold which ruptured the deck forward of the bridge and blew off the hatch cover. This led to flooding of the hold and the engine room. The ship was then hit at 17.10 hours by two more torpedoes on the starboard side at the traverse bulkhead between holds #2 and #3. The eight officers, 34 crewmen, 26 armed guards and 107 US Army troops abandoned ship in four lifeboats and six rafts. Soon after, the ship was hit by a coup de grâce at the #1 hold. This caused the ship to break in two. The forward section sank immediately, while the after section stayed afloat and was last seen deep in the water in the evening of February 8th. At the time of its sinking, the ship was carrying 2,700 tons of US Army supplies, in addition to 317 mules bound for Burma.

Searches were conducted by all available aircraft from the Royal Australian Air Force (RAAF), United States Navy (USN), and ships of the USN, Australian and British navies. Within two days, 15 survivors in a lifeboat were picked up by the American steam merchant Cape Edmont and landed at Fremantle, Australia on February 12, 1945. On February 16, a Consolidated B-24L Liberator (A72-124), of 25 Sqn RAAF crashed at RAAF Cunderdin, while taking off to search, killing five of its 10 crew members. 20 survivors in a third boat were picked up on February 28, 1945 by HMS Activity (D 94) and landed at Fremantle on March 2, 1945. The last 15 survivors in another boat, adrift for 32 days, were rescued on March 9, 1945 by USS Rock (SS 274) and landed at Exmouth Gulf. The last lifeboat carrying 1 crewmen, 7 armed guards and 25 troops was lost.

The Peter Silvester was the last ship sunk by German U-boats in the Indian Ocean.

Survivors
Some of the survivors from the ship, that a rescued sailor wrote down.

Harry Drosis (Merchant Marine) from Tujunga, California
Ralph Eisman (Merchant Marine) from Inglewood, California
Angelo V Giudice (Merchant Marine) from New York City
Gene M Poole (Merchant Marine) from San Pedro, California
Arthur Turner (Merchant Marine) from San Pedro, California
Bruce McClaire (Merchant Marine) from Los Angeles, California - 2nd engineer
Robert Weaver (Merchant Marine) from Los Angeles, California
Pvt Ray Laemen (US Army) from Detroit, Michigan
Pvt Joe Kamertz (US Army) from Phoenixville, Pennsylvania
Pvt Tommy Movowski (US Army) from Detroit, Michigan
Pvt Henry Cieslak (US Army) from Detroit, Michigan
Pvt Walter Graham (US Army) from Burton, Ohio
Capt Charlie P Hatfield (US Army) from Arlington, California
GM3/c James A Saucier (US Army) from New Orleans, Louisiana
S1/c Richard Butler (US Army) from Cedar Ridge, California
S1/c M. D. Copeland (US Army) from Pembroke, Georgia
Jack Easley 2nd mate (Merchant Marine) from San Pedro, California
S1/c Jerry Poole (US Army) from Horatio, Arkansas
Capt Bernard C. Dennis (Merchant Marine) from San Pedro, California
Larry Casselli (US Army) from Grass Valley, California
Dick Sproul (US Army) from Yakima, Washington
T/4 Chester Lee Hixson (US Army Air Forces) from Charlotte, North Carolina
Pvt Tom Spicketts (US Army)
Pvt Tom Tschirhart (US Army)

Glenwood Skaggs from Mineral Point, Missouri
Frank Kolb (US ARMY) from East Orange, New Jersey
Cpl William S. Holmes (US Army Air Corp) from (Chicago, Illinois)
T/4 Mario Martinelli (US Army) from Conshohocken, Pennsylvania

See also

Peter Silvester (1734–1808)
List of Liberty ships
List of shipwrecks in February 1945

References

External links
 SS Peter Silvester

1942 ships
Liberty ships
Ships sunk by German submarines in World War II
Maritime incidents in February 1945
World War II merchant ships of the United States
World War II shipwrecks in the Indian Ocean